Kirk Mill is an early example of an Arkwright-type cotton mill and a grade II listed building in Chipping, Lancashire, in Ribble Valley, to the north of Preston, Lancashire, England. It was built in the 1780s on the site of a corn mill dating from at least 1544. The mill continued spinning cotton using water frames and then throstles until 1886, when it was sold and became HJ Berry's chairmaking factory.
It was powered by a  waterwheel which continued in use, generating electricity until the 1940s.

Chipping really thrived during the Industrial Revolution when there were seven mills located along Chipping Brook. The last survivor was Kirk Mill, the chair making factory of HJ Berry, but in 2010 the company went into administration, the factory closed, and on 7 March 2011 the works were bought by SCPi Bowland Ltd

Significant refurbishment works including a full re-roof, stone cleaning, re-pointing with lime mortar, removal of incongruous late additions and the introduction of structural steelwork were completed in spring 2017

Location
Kirk Mill, its 1-acre mill pond behind an embankment, the mill masters mansion Kirk House, the mill manager's house Grove Cottage and the 1823 workhouse are clustered together on the Chipping Brook, a few hundred yards from Chipping Church.

History
The original corn mill built on this site was operating in 1544. On the 2 February 1785, Richard Dilworth passed the corn mill to Richard Salisbury of Chipping a cotton manufacturer and William Barrow a merchant of Lancaster, the new mill was functioning by July. On 15 April 1788 the site was offered for sale, and in the advertisement details of its size and equipment were given. Grove House was built in the 1790s. It was sold again in 1802, and by then it also housed a 336 spindle mule and an outbuilding suitable for 3 further mules. Mules were more suitable to spinning the softer weft, while water frames of throstles produced a harder twist more suitable for the warp or sewing cotton. An adjoined house that was described as a residence for a genteel family, a further cottage was used as an apprentice house. It is probable that alterations that lengthened the mill were made then. In 1823 Grove Row was constructed as a workhouse, it closed in 1838 and was converted into 5 cottages.  One of these cottages served as a shop until 1949.
In 1881 the census shows that 10 men, 7 boys and 24 women were employed in the mill.

The cotton mill closed in 1886, and it was acquired by furniture manufacturers. The water wheel stopped being the prime mover in 1923 but drove an electricity generator proving power and light to adjoining houses. Electricity didn't reach the rest of Chipping until 1933. The wheel stopped turning in about 1940, and the top part was cut away to release more space to the mill.

HJ Berry into administration in 2010, the chair making factory closed. On 7 March 2011 the works were bought by SCPi Bowland Ltd. They are restoring the wheel and the factory and introducing new usages onto the rest of the site.

Arkwright-type mills
Richard Arkwright was a hard-nosed businessman from Preston. Arkwright produced a continuous spinning machine that was unlike Hargreaves' hand-operated spinning jenny. The jenny required two motions, one to draw and the other to spin and wind. Arkwrights frame spun and wound at the same time and was operated by turning a wheel. The prototype that was powered by hand, was patented in 1769. The process was particular suitable to the application of power which in those times meant a water wheel. Arkwright developed the principle into an industrial machine where a pair of frames would have 96 spindles. In searching for a reliable source of power Arkwright set up his first factory on Cromford, on the River Derwent in Derbyshire. In 1775, he filed a patents for powered preparatory machines that would card and scutch the roving needed by the waterframe. The lantern frame, to draw the roving, and development of the waterframe known as a throstle followed.

Multiple machines were made and placed in one building or factory. The whole process was mechanised; this style of textile production was called the factory system, the operatives had no control on the speed of production or influence on the product, they served the needs of the machines.  Arkwright protected his patent and had absolute control over the use of the system. He allowed others to manufacture under licence, but only if they purchased the complete range of machines. To do so they needed plenty of initial capital and a purpose built mill, built mainly to his dimensions with a suitable power source. His patents were revoked in 1785. A watermill required a reliable steady supply of water; while this could be a river that ran at the same velocity throughout the year or a leat running from a river that provided a constant head, but more often a millpond would be built with sluices to regulate the head.

The pairs of frames would be placed one per window bay as natural light was the means of illumination. An overhead shaft running the length of the building turned wooded drums at floor level, which by means of leather belts powered the frames. They were built under the supervision of specialist such as Thomas Lowe of Nottingham and John Sutcliffe of Halifax.

The buildings
It had 26 spinning frames. By the mill were a smithy, a barn and eight cottages.

The reservoir holds  and is fed by 3 brooks: Wolfhouse (Chipping) Brook, Garstang (Dobson's) Brook and Leagram Brook. The reservoir was built in 1785, and water passed through a cast iron launder into the mill.

Later use
The mill continued to spin cotton using throstles until 1886, when it became a furniture making factory. In 2010 HJ Berry, the furniture manufacturer went into administration and the factory closed. The site was bought by SCPi Bowland Ltd. who have put in detailed planning permission, which includes restoration of the 1785 mill and the waterwheel.

See also
Listed buildings in Chipping, Lancashire
Cromford Mill

References

External links

Kirk Mill official website

Textile mills in Lancashire
Buildings and structures in Ribble Valley
Forest of Bowland
Grade II listed buildings in Lancashire
Grade II listed industrial buildings